Armor in the Indian subcontinent was used since antiquity. Its earlier reference is found in the vedic period. Armor has been described in religious texts; including the Itihasa epics Ramayana and Mahabharat, as well as in the Puranas.

Vedic period

The Vedic age recorded in-fighting among Indian clans for supremacy over the Indus. In the Battle of the Ten Kings  prominent Vedic clans clashed along the Ravi River. The Vedas and the other texts of the period record these struggles in detail and provide a clear picture of the military set up of during those periods. 

The concept of a warrior class had already gained ground and the kshatriya claimed to have originated from the arms of Purusha. They tried to maintain this distinct identity of their own through their garments and attire. The common attire (when they are not situated at the battlefield) for the kshatriya warrior was deer skin. Their under-garments were made cloak dyed with madder. They also wore hemp thread and a bow string as a mark of distinction.

Armour was prominently mentioned in the Rigveda:

 

The defensive armors became the integral part of military costume. They were worn after duly sanctified by mantras. It appears that they were used only by the nobility. The average soldier wore deer skin, and is mentioned in the Atharvaveda, stating that the shield and outfit made of deer skin struck terror amid the enemies of god. The nobles and elite warriors wore a coat of mail called a drapi, kavacha, or varman. They covered their back, chest, and lower parts of their body.

Certain warriors in the Vedic period wore metal armour called varman. In the Rig Veda the varman is described as sewn armor or a coat of mail that covers the whole body.

Historians such as Edward Washburn Hopkins deduce that the armour was metal that covered the body and was connected by wires. On the head multiple metal pieces were connected together for helmets.

The kavacha is described to be plate armour and tightly fitted, and covered the chest. The word kavaca is used in Atharva Veda in the sense of a corselet breast plate as opposed to the varman:

The use of helmets is frequently mentioned in the vedas. Shirastrana was a helmet or head guard worn by soldiers to protect the head. Siprin would mean a person wearing a helmet. Common soldiers would go bare headed, some kept long hairs and wore animal horns. Indra is described as the golden helmeted hero:

Hastaghna was and arm guard used to protect the hands. It was worn on the left arm to avoid friction of bow strings. It was made of leather but later on metal gauntlets seem to have used instead.

For the protection of the legs; greaves, anklets, and shoes were used. The noble warriors wore ornaments like armlets, bracelets, clasps, necklaces, and various garlands.

Antiquity 
Armour is discussed in Chanakya's Arthashastra (320 BCE).

The Kingdom of Magadha rapidly expanded its military infrastructure under King Ajatashatru, creating the foundation of later empires in Pataliputra. He introduced the rathamusala, an armoured chariot with protruding blades.

The Bharhut Stupa depicts the use of leather scale armour. Furthermore, on the Sanchi Stupa, soldiers are depicted wearing quilted armour.

There are references by historians noting the armour King Porus used in battle against Alexander. The scholar Arrian recorded that the armour was shot-proof, and remarkably well fitted.

Mythological armour 
In Mahabharata, there are much evidence of using armour during the battles.

Kavacha
 Karna Kavacha - The armour of Karna that was granted by his father Surya at birth. It was impenetrable even to heavenly weapons.
 Shiva-Kavacha - The armour of Lord Shiva which will make its wielder invincible.
Khetaka
 Jaivardhan - A shield of Lord Vishnu and Lord Shiva.
 The shield of Shamba.
 Srivatsa - The shield of Vishnu, a symbol worshiped and revered by the Hindus, said to be manifested on the god's chest.

Gupta period

During the Gupta period scale mail armour used as composed of metal and sometimes leather. Guptas were more than two centuries more advanced than the equipment and technology being depicted here and that their armour was built to withstand torsion-driven steel bows. Siva-Dhanur-Veda discusses the military of the Gupta Empire. The Guptas relied heavily on armoured war elephants; horses were used little if at all. The use of chariots had declined heavily by the time of the Guptas, as they had not proved very useful against the Greeks, Scythians, and other invaders. Guptas utilised heavy cavalry clad in mail armour and equipped with maces and lances, who would have used shock action to break the enemy line.

During the Satavahana period the armour was inspired by the armour used by the Indo-Scythians and the Alchon Huns.

Medieval period

Medieval period (1206 CE-1526 CE) 
During 12th century chainmail  armour is first introduced in the Indian subcontinent and used by Turkic armies. A reference of chainmail armour was found in the inscription of Mularaja II and also at the Battle of Delhi where it was used by the armoured war elephants. Udayaprabha Suri, in his Sukrita-Kirti-Kallolini, states that Naikidevi gave Mularaja an army to play with. With this army, Mularaja defeated the Hammira (Sanskrit form of Emir) and his mlechchha army, whose soldiers were covered from head to toe in order to protect themselves.

Modern Period (1526 CE-1857 CE)

Mughal armour 
In the 16th century the armour in the Indian subcontinent incorporated plated embedded into mail.  Armour such as chainmail and scale mail are widely used by the Mughals.  The use of Mail and plate armour in india declined in the 18th century. Mail and plate armour was documented Battle of Plassey in 1757.

Mughal helmets
Despite the similarity in their design, the Khula Khud helmets were decorated with a wide degree of variations depending on the cultures from which they were created. Decorations often appeared in the skull and the nasal bar, which were often heavily decorated with patterned motifs of inlaid brass, silver or gold; or decorated with figurative images. One Mughal top helmet featured calligraphic inscriptions from the Quran, supposedly to gain "Help from Allah and a speedy victory." A top discovered in Gwalior, India, featured a motif of the skull and crossbones sign of European influence. Another part of the Khula Khud helmet that was often a focus of artistic decoration, was the leaf-shaped finials of the nasal bar. A Sikh top featured the figure of Ganesha carved onto the nasal bar. The Khula Khud helmet was only decorated with some metals, and usually no organic decorations.

Maratha armour
Maratha armour is very similar to the Mughal armour but in the Maratha army, the infantry used armour while the cavalry is always lightly armoured, such as the leather armour. Maratha armour is mostly inspired by the Mughal armour.

References

Further reading 
 Roy, Kaushik. From Hydaspes to Kargil: A History of Warfare in India from 326 BC to AD 1999 (2004)
 Sandhu, Gurcharn Singh. Military History of Medieval India (2003)

Asian armour
Military history of India
Military equipment of India